is a passenger railway station located in the city of Maniwa, Okayama Prefecture, Japan, operated by West Japan Railway Company (JR West).

Lines

Station layout
The station consists of two opposed ground-level side platforms. The station building is located on the side of the platform bound for Tsuyama, and both platforms are connected by a footbridge.The station is staffed.
There is a station building built in May 2005.. The station is unattended.

Platforms

Adjacent stations

History
Mimasaka-Ochiai Station opened on May 1, 1924. With the privatization of the Japan National Railways (JNR) on April 1, 1987, the station came under the aegis of the West Japan Railway Company. The station building was rebuilt in 1994.

Passenger statistics
In fiscal 2019, the station was used by an average of 221 passengers daily..

Surrounding area
Maniwa City Hall Ochiai Branch Office (former Ochiai Town Hall)
Okayama Prefectural Ochiai High School
 Maniwa Municipal Ochiai Elementary School

See also
List of railway stations in Japan

References

External links

 Mimasaka-Ochiai Station Official Site

Railway stations in Okayama Prefecture
Kishin Line
Railway stations in Japan opened in 1924
Maniwa